The Philippine House Committee on Justice, or House Justice Committee is a standing committee of the Philippine House of Representatives.

Its chairperson also sits as an ex officio member of the Judicial and Bar Council from January 1 to June 30 of the calendar year.

Jurisdiction 
As prescribed by House Rules, the committee's jurisdiction includes the following:
 Administration of justice
 Adult probation
 Definition of crimes and other offenses punishable by law and their penalties
 Deportation
 Immigration
 Impeachment proceedings
 Judiciary
 Legal aid
 Naturalization
 Penitentiaries and reform schools
 Practice of law and integration of the Bar
 Registration of land titles

Members, 18th Congress

See also 
 House of Representatives of the Philippines
 List of Philippine House of Representatives committees
 Department of Justice

References

External links 
House of Representatives of the Philippines

Justice
Parliamentary committees on Justice